Rudnik-Kolonia is a village in the administrative district of Gmina Wilkołaz, within Kraśnik County, Lublin Voivodeship, in eastern Poland.

The village has a population of 330.

References

Rudnik-Kolonia